Andre Khalil (born August 23, 1977), better known by his pseudonym and stage name Conner Habib, is an American writer, podcaster, academic, activist and former pornographic actor of Syrian and Irish descent. He hosts Against Everyone With Conner Habib, a podcast where he discusses current events and politics, as well as philosophy, science and spiritual ideas by himself or with guests. Habib has written for numerous publications, including BuzzFeed, Salon.com, MEL Magazine, The Stranger, Vice, Slate, and The Irish Times. As an adult performer, Habib has appeared in pornographic scenes in films distributed by companies such as Titan Media, Men.com, Falcon Entertainment, and Raging Stallion Studios.

Early life
Andre Khalil was born on August 23, 1974, to a Syrian father and an Irish-American mother. He grew up in Catasauqua, Pennsylvania, in a home environment he describes as “irreligious”. His parents divorced during his childhood, and both have since remarried. Habib would frequently visit Ireland, his mother's homeland, in later years. Habib described himself as having a rebellious streak growing up: he recalled spending his teenage years immersed in the Pennsylvania punk scene, and that he once stole a book that deals with occult topics from the school library.

Khalil was first exposed to pornography at a young age when he was watching television with his family via a cable-cheater box which stole channels from their neighbors: Khalil's father accidentally happened upon a channel dedicated to adult pornographic content, but the remote control failed to respond when they attempted to change channels. Khalil credited the experience for instigating his curiosity about pornography that persisted to his adulthood, and led him to question what he believed to be the disconnect between society's consistent stigmatization of sexual imagery and the desire for the same by its members.

Career

Academia
From 2004 to 2007, Khalil taught literature and composition while studying writing and evolutionary biology at the University of Massachusetts Amherst. He won the Distinguished Teaching Award for his efforts. In 2007 he worked as an English instructor at Western New England University in Springfield, Massachusetts. Khalil eventually relocated to San Francisco to pursue his dream to become an adult performer, though he continued to work as a writer and teacher.

Pornography
Khalil came up with the name "Conner Habib" after he witnessed two straight men dry humping each other out of jest in a bar in Killarney. His pseudonym reflects his Irish and Syrian heritage: the last name Habib is a Middle Eastern name which deliberately highlights an underrepresented identity in pornography.
According to Habib, his decision to create a name meant that he assumed a new identity which protects him as an adult performer from complicated and often discriminatory entanglements.

Habib won the GayVN Award for Best Newcomer in 2010. Habib was nominated for several awards at the 2012 Grabby Awards, and won Best Supporting Actor for his performance in the film Dad Goes to College. In 2016, Habib was the co-winner of "Best All Male Threesome" for Dad Out West  at the Raven's Eden Awards. Habib appeared in over 150 scenes featuring sexually explicit content during his time working in the adult entertainment industry.
Habib's insight and opinion on pornography work inspired the title of the epilogue for author Heather Berg's 2021 publication, Porn Work: Sex, Labor, and Late Capitalism.

Post-pornography
Habib relocated to Dublin, Ireland in 2019, where he became involved in projects unrelated to his pornography career. Habib hosted Ulysses - For The Rest Of Us!, a live lecture series and book club centered on James Joyce’s Ulysses in collaboration with the Museum Of Literature Ireland. The series ran from June through September 2021, which coincided with the commencement of the Bloomsday festival on June 16, 2021. In October 2021, Habib co-curated an event called “Utopia Ireland” with Una Mullally for The National Concert Hall over the course of five days and nights. Habib's debut novel, Hawk Mountain, was published by W. W. Norton & Company on July 5, 2022.

Activism
Habib often advocates for sex workers' rights and sex positivity in his writings and presentations. In 2013, Habib promoted discussions about sex positivity and sexual health in a series of presentations and workshops. One such event, which was to be held at Corning Community College and organized by the student group Equal, was canceled after his invitation was rescinded by the college's president following her discovery of Habib's involvement with the adult film industry. Habib authored an article published by BuzzFeed, where he criticized the school president's decision to publicly denounce him. Habib would end up leading a free discussion off-campus at Southeast Steuben County Library, which is located near Corning Community College, on March 21, 2013.

Between 2014 and 2016, he served as the Vice President of the Adult Performer Advocacy Committee, a nonprofit organization with goals of improving quality of life and experiences in the industry of active adult performers. Habib was awarded Publicist of the Year at the Sexual Freedom Awards in recognition of his efforts to promote sex-positive attitudes through his writings and presentations.

Podcast
Habib is the host of the counterculture podcast Against Everyone With Conner Habib. It launched on June 6, 2017, on YouTube, with Habib intending to release at least two episodes each month as an ongoing series. According to Habib, the podcast's name has a dual meaning: it represents his personal desire to resist "dumb ideas and bad public conversations and stupid think pieces" propagated by powerful and influential people, as well as his "aspiration to be against everyone, in the sense of literally pressing up against everyone." The podcast's subject matter is eclectic and may include topics such as radical philosophy, occultism, sexuality, science and literature. Notable individuals who follow the podcast include American musician Michael Stipe, and English singer Olly Alexander.

Personal life
Habib was based in Los Angeles prior to his relocation to Ireland. Habib was previously in a relationship with game designer and musician Jeb Havens for five years. They have since remained close friends. Habib is a follower of anthroposophy, a spiritualist movement founded by the esotericist Rudolf Steiner.

References

External links 
Official website

1974 births
21st-century American non-fiction writers
21st-century American novelists
21st-century LGBT people
American LGBT novelists
American LGBT rights activists
American actors in gay pornographic films
American bloggers
American expatriates in the Republic of Ireland
American gay actors
American gay writers
American people of Irish descent
American people of Syrian descent
American podcasters
American social commentators
Gay pornographic film actors
LGBT people from Pennsylvania
Living people
Place of birth missing (living people)
Pornographic film actors from Pennsylvania
Sex worker activists in the United States
Social philosophers
University of Massachusetts Amherst alumni
Western New England University faculty
Writers from Pennsylvania